The Maplewood Public Library is a public library in Maplewood, Missouri, a suburb of St. Louis. The library was established in 1935.

It is a member of the Municipal Library Consortium of St. Louis County, nine independent libraries in St. Louis County.

References

External links
 
 Libraries.org | https://librarytechnology.org/library/20160

Public libraries in Missouri
Libraries in Greater St. Louis
Municipal Library Consortium of St. Louis County
1935 establishments in Missouri